The Magic Mountain site is an Archaic and Woodland village site in Jefferson County, Colorado dating from 4999 BC to 1000 AD.  The site was added to the National Register of Historic Places in 1980.

The site was named for the property owner Magic Mountain Amusement Park in the late 1950s.  One hundred years before, the area was the Apex mining district, served by a small stagecoach stop.

Geography
Magic Mountain site, in the foothills of the Rocky Mountains in the Denver Basin, is located by Apex Creek.  The ecosystem is a transitional mountain-plains zone.
It is located at: 39°42'50"N 105°12'42"W

History
Within the Denver Basin, prehistoric time periods are traditionally identified as: Paleo-Indian, Archaic and Ceramic, or Woodland periods.  The Denver basin is a geological definition of a portion of the Colorado Piedmont, from Colorado Springs, Colorado, to Wyoming. The Palmer Divide, with elevations from 6,000 to 7,500, is a subsection of that area that separates the South Platte River watershed from that of the Arkansas River.  It runs perpendicular to the Rocky Mountains and divides the Denver metropolitan area from the southern Pikes Peak area.

Archaic periods
People of the Archaic period were hunters of smaller game, such as deer, antelope and rabbits, and gatherers of wild plants. The people moved seasonally to hunting and gathering sites. Late in the Archaic period, about 200-500 A.D., corn was introduced into the diet and pottery-making became an occupation for storing and carrying food.

Colorado High Plains Woodland period
The groups of people during this period became much more diverse, were more likely to settle in a location or a couple of locations, cultivate, domesticate animals, make pottery and baskets, and perform ceremonial rituals.

Archaeology

Artifacts
Lithic tools and projectile points were found at the site that helped to redefine past assumptions about the area Archaic and Woodland cultures. Corner notched projectile points found at the site were named Apex points and were similar to New Mexican En Medio and San José projectile points.

The archaeological evidence was obtained from six layers, classified into zones A-F.

There are some Fremont artifacts found in Zone A, judged to be attained through trading.  A small cemetery led to the discovery of the archaeological remains on the site, but much of it had been looted before the excavation.

Excavations

Collection
The collection of 2,500 artifacts from the Magic Mountain archaeological site were moved to the Denver Museum of Nature and Science in 2001.

Historical significance
The site is distinctive for its significant collection of Early, Middle and Late Archaic artifacts, burial sites and multi-cultural history.

See also
 List of prehistoric sites in Colorado

Notes

References

Bibliography
 Colwell, Chip; Nash, Stephen E.; Holen, Steven R. (2010) Crossroads of Culture: Anthropology Collections of the Denver Museum of Nature & Science. Boulder: University Press of Colorado.
 Gibbon, Guy E.; Ames, Kenneth M. Archaeology of Prehistoric Native America: An Encyclopedia.  1998. .
 Golden Pioneer Museum. (2002) Golden, Colorado. Chicago: Arcadia Publishing. p. 22. .
 Irwin, Henry J. and Cynthia C. Irwin (1966) Excavations at Magic Mountain: A Diachronic Study of Plains-Southwest Relations. Denver Museum of Natural History Proceedings Number 12. October 20, 1966.
 Justice, Noel D. (2002). Stone Age spear and arrow points of the Southwestern United States. Bloomington Indiana: Indiana University Press. .
 Kipfer, Barbara Ann. (2000). Encyclopedic Dictionary of Archaeology. New York:Plenum Publisher. .
 Nelson, Michael; Laubach, Tony. Where Is That? Explaining The Different Regions of Colorado. The Denver Channel. October 27, 2009. Retrieved 9-28-2011.
 Nelson, Sarah M. (2008).  Denver: An Archaeological History. Boulder, CO: University Press of Colorado. .
 Waldman, Carl (2009) [1985]. Atlas of the North American. New York: Facts on File. .

Further reading
 Butler, W.B. (1986). Reinterpreting the Magic Mountain Site. Southwestern Lore. 56(3):8-21.
 Griffin-Pierce, Trudy. (2010). The Columbia Guide to American Indians of the Southwest. New York:Columbia University Press. .
 Gunnerson, James H. (1987). Archaeology of the High Plains. Denver: United States Forest Service.

Archaeological sites on the National Register of Historic Places in Colorado
Geography of Jefferson County, Colorado
National Register of Historic Places in Jefferson County, Colorado
Plains Woodland period